Holeby is a small town in Lolland Municipality, in Region Zealand, Denmark. It was the seat of Holeby Municipality. Holeby is the planned location of Lolland South railway station, set to open in 2028 on the line to Germany via the Fehmarn Belt Fixed Link.

Notable people 
 Erhard Frederiksen (1843-1903) a Danish agronomist and sugar manufacturer;  he co-founded a sugar factory at Holeby in 1872-74
 Ole Søltoft (1941–1999) a Danish actor, an icon of the 1970s wave of Danish erotic feature film comedies; he grew up in Holeby

References   

Cities and towns in Region Zealand
Lolland Municipality